Bulbophyllum rimannii is a species of orchid. Previously known as Acrochaene rimannii, it was placed within Bulbophyllum in 2014. It is native to Sikkim, Bhutan, Assam, Myanmar and Thailand.

References

External links
IOSPE

rimannii
Flora of Bhutan
Flora of Assam (region)
Orchids of Myanmar
Orchids of India
Orchids of Thailand
Flora of Sikkim